John 17 is the seventeenth chapter of the Gospel of John in the New Testament of the Christian Bible. It portrays a prayer of Jesus Christ addressed to his Father, placed in context immediately before his betrayal and crucifixion, the events which the gospel often refers to as his glorification. Lutheran writer David Chytraeus entitled Jesus' words "the prayer of the high priest". Methodist theologian Joseph Benson calls this prayer "Our Lord’s Intercessory Prayer", because "it is considered as a pattern of the intercession he is now making in heaven for his people". The New King James Version divides this chapter into three sections:
: Jesus Prays for Himself
: Jesus Prays for His Disciples
: Jesus Prays for All Believers.
The book containing this chapter is anonymous, but early Christian tradition uniformly affirmed that John composed this Gospel.

Text

The original text was written in Koine Greek. This chapter is divided into 26 verses.

Textual witnesses
Some early manuscripts containing the text of this chapter are: 
Papyrus 108 (2nd/3rd century; extant verses 23–24)
Papyrus 66 (~200; complete)
Papyrus 107 (3rd century; extant verses 1–2,11)
Codex Vaticanus (325-350)
Codex Sinaiticus (330-360)
Codex Bezae (~400)
Codex Alexandrinus (400-440)
Codex Ephraemi Rescriptus (~450; complete)
Papyrus 84 (6th century; extant verses 3, 7–8)
Papyrus 60 (~700; complete).
Papyrus 59 (7th century; extant verses 24–26).

Jesus' Prayer
Jesus refers to his Father six times in this chapter, calling God "Father" (pater), "Holy Father" (pater hagie) and "Righteous Father" (pater dikaie). These are the only occurrences in the New Testament of the vocative forms αγιε and δικαιε, used in direct address to God.

Verse 1
Jesus spoke these words, lifted up His eyes to heaven, and said: "Father, the hour has come. Glorify Your Son, that Your Son also may glorify You".

Alternatively, "After Jesus had spoken these words ..." (to his disciples, in chapter 16), namely:
"These things I have spoken to you, that in Me you may have peace. In the world you will have tribulation; but be of good cheer, I have overcome the world."
Benson suggested that "these words" refers to "the words recorded in the three preceding chapters" (chapters 14 to 16).

Verse 2
"As You have given Him authority over all flesh, that He should give eternal life to as many as You have given Him.
"Over all flesh" (σαρκός, sarkos), from the noun σὰρξ (sarx), becomes "all people" in the New International Version and the Good News Translation. Alfred Plummer argues that "fallen man, man in his frailty, is specially meant".

Verse 11
Now I am no longer in the world, but these are in the world, and I come to You. Holy Father, keep through Your name those whom You have given Me, that they may be one as We are.
Swedish-based commentator René Kieffer distinguishes chapter 17 from the rest of Jesus' farewell discourse, referring to "a kind of timeless aspect" denoted by the words "I am no longer in the world".

Verse 12 
New King James Version
 While I was with them in the world, I kept them in Your name. Those whom You gave Me I have kept; and none of them is lost except the son of perdition, that the Scripture might be fulfilled.
The words "in the world" are omitted by the best authorities. Judas' actions fulfill the words of :
Even my close friend, someone I trusted, one who shared my bread, has turned against me.

Verse 21 

King James Version
 that they all may be one, as You, Father, are in Me, and I in You; that they also may be one in Us, that the world may believe that You sent Me.

See also 
 Farewell Discourse
 Jerusalem
 Jesus Christ
 That they all may be one
 Ut unum sint
Related Bible parts: John 13, John 14, John 15, John 16

References

External links
 King James Bible - Wikisource
English Translation with Parallel Latin Vulgate
Online Bible at GospelHall.org (ESV, KJV, Darby, American Standard Version, Bible in Basic English)
Multiple bible versions at Bible Gateway (NKJV, NIV, NRSV etc.)

John 17